The Dayton Flyers basketball statistical leaders are individual statistical leaders of the Dayton Flyers basketball program in various categories, including points, rebounds, assists, steals, and blocks. Within those areas, the lists identify single-game, single-season, and career leaders. The Flyers represent the University of Dayton in the NCAA's Atlantic 10 Conference.

Dayton began competing in intercollegiate basketball in 1903. However, the school's record book does not generally list records from before the 1950s, as records from before this period are often incomplete and inconsistent. Since scoring was much lower in this era, and teams played much fewer games during a typical season, it is likely that few or no players from this era would appear on these lists anyway.

The NCAA did not officially record assists as a stat until the 1983–84 season, and blocks and steals until the 1985–86 season, but Dayton's record books includes players in these stats before these seasons. These lists are updated through the St. Louis game of the 2022–23 season.

Scoring

Rebounds

Assists

Steals

Blocks

References

Lists of college basketball statistical leaders by team
Statistical